Martland is a surname. Notable people with the surname include:

Clive Martland (born 1968), British Royal Air Force officer 
Harrison Stanford Martland (1883–1954), American pathologist
Peter Martland (born 1947), historian
Ronald Martland (1907–1997), Canadian judge
Steve Martland (1959–2013), English classical composer